Jason Taylor (born 23 September 1968) is a former Australian rules footballer in the Australian Football League.

Family
The third of three generations of VFL/AFL footballers: his grandfather was Cliff "Beau" Taylor, and his father was Noel Taylor.

Football
Taylor played 91 games for Fitzroy, Hawthorn, and Collingwood from 1990 to 1997.

See also
 List of Australian rules football families

References

External links
Jason Taylor at the Collingwood Football Club website 

Australian rules footballers from Tasmania
Fitzroy Football Club players
Hawthorn Football Club players
Collingwood Football Club players
New Norfolk Football Club players
1968 births
Living people
Place of birth missing (living people)
Allies State of Origin players